Manfred Schwartz (November 11, 1909 in Łódź, Poland – November 7, 1970 in New York City, United States) was a Polish-born American artist who was educated at the Sorbonne in Paris, the Académie de la Grande Chaumière in Paris, the Art Students League of New York, and the National Academy of Design in New York City. He also studied with Charles Hawthorne, John Sloan, and George Bridgman.

Schwartz married twice. His first wife, advertising executive Clara Apfel, died in 1964; they had one son, Paul Waldo Schwartz, an art critic in Paris. In 1966, he married Anne Schnall, the former wife of investor, M. Elliot Schnall. After his death he was interred at Montefiore Cemetery in Queens, New York.

References

Biography

1909 births
1970 deaths
Polish emigrants to the United States
University of Paris alumni
Art Students League of New York alumni
National Academy of Design alumni
20th-century American painters
American male painters
Alumni of the Académie de la Grande Chaumière
20th-century American male artists